Dunaferr Sportegyesület  was a Hungarian handball club from Dunaújváros, that is part of the multi-sports club running under the same name. The team enjoyed their best spell in the early 2000s, having won the Hungarian Championship in 2000 and the Hungarian Cup in 2001. Beside the domestic success they also reached the finals of the EHF Cup Winners' Cup in 2000 and the semifinals of the EHF Cup three years later.

After February 2011 the official name of the club was Dunaferr Alexandra due to sponsorship reasons. The men's handball division of Dunaferr SE was closed on 1 July 2011.

Honours

National
Nemzeti Bajnokság I
 Winner (1): 2000
 Runners-up (4): 1997, 1998, 1999, 2001
 Bronze (8): 2002, 2003, 2004, 2005, 2006, 2007, 2008, 2009

Magyar Kupa:
 Winner (1): 2001

International
EHF Cup Winners' Cup:
Finalists: 2000
Semifinalists: 2002
EHF Cup:
Semifinalists: 2003
EHF Champions Trophy:
 Semifinalists: 2000

Individual awards

Domestic
Nemzeti Bajnokság I Top Scorer

Kits

Sports Hall information
Name: – Dunaferr Sportcsarnok
City: – Dunaújváros
Capacity: – 1200
Address: – 2400 Dunaújváros, Eszperantó út 2–4.

Team
Squad for the 2010–2011 season

Goalkeepers
1  Dániel Repóth
2  Zsolt Kovács
 12  Róbert Kovács
Left Wingers
5  István Szepesi
6  László Széles
 19  Zoltán Morva
Right Wingers
 18  Ákos Pásztor
 22  Dániel Nagy
 26  Bence Tárkányi
 47  Péter Hornyák
Line players
4  József Kemény
 11  Mohamed Yassine Benmiloud
 14  Antal Muhl
 24  Tibor Szabó

Left Backs
8  Richárd Bali
9  Richárd Bodó
 17  Gábor Hajdú
Central Backs
7  Gábor Zubai
 13  Vladimir Kuzmichev
 23  Bence Takács
Right Backs
 15  Gábor Németh
 21  László Kurbély
 32  Gábor Pulay

Transfers
Transfers for the 2011–12 season

Joining 

Leaving 
  József Kemény (LP) (retires) 
  Richárd Bodó (LB) (to  Grundfos Tatabánya KC)
  Bence Takács (CB) (to  Grundfos Tatabánya KC)
  Ákos Pásztor (RW) (to  Grundfos Tatabánya KC)
  Zoltán Morva (LW) (to  Mezőkövesdi KC)
  Tibor Szabó (LP) (to  Mezőkövesdi KC)
  Richárd Bali (LB) (to  Orosházi FKSE)
  Vladimir Kuzmichev (CB) (to  Balatonfüredi KSE)
  Gábor Pulay (RB) (to  Balatonfüredi KSE)
  Péter Hornyák (RW) (to  Balatonfüredi KSE)
  Bence Tárkányi (RW) (to  Balatonfüredi KSE)
  Dániel Nagy (RW) (to  Balatonfüredi KSE)
  Mohamed Yassine Benmiloud (LP) (to  Balatonfüredi KSE)
  Gábor Hajdú (LB) (to  PLER KC)
  László Kurbély (RB) (to  Pécsi VSE)
  István Szepesi (LW) (to  Pécsi VSE)
  László Széles (LW) (to  Csurgói KK)
  Dániel Repóth (GK) (to  DVTK-Eger)
  Antal Muhl (LP) (to  Mizse KC)
  Gábor Németh (RB) (to  ETO - SZESE Győr FKC)
  Zsolt Kovács (GK) (to  Hajdúnánás KSE)
  Róbert Kovács (GK) (to ?)
  Gábor Zubai (CB) (to ?)

List of the 2000 Hungarian champion team

Technical and managerial staff

Retired numbers

    Szergej Kuzmicsov, Central Back

Former club members

Notable former players

 Gábor Ancsin
 Sándor Bajusz
 Dávid Bakos
 Tamás Bene
 Mohamed Yassine Benmiloud
 Richárd Bodó
 Gábor Császár
 Gábor Décsi
 János Dénes
 Nándor Fazekas
 Gyula Gál
 Gábor Grebenár
 Péter Gúnya
 Péter Hornyák
 Tamás Iváncsik
 Viktor Károlyfi
 Dávid Katzirz
 József Kemény
 Balázs Kertész
  Milorad Krivokapić
  Szergej Kuzmicsov
 László Marosi
 Roland Mikler
 Zoltán Miss
 Tamás Mocsai
 Kornél Nagy
 Ákos Pásztor
 Miklós Rosta
 Ákos Sándor
 Gábor Szalafai
 János Szathmári
 István Szepesi
 Bence Takács
 Csaba Tombor
 Edmond Tóth
 József Tóth
 Szabolcs Törő
 Szabolcs Zubai
 Tamás Zsembery
 Janko Božović
 Sasa Djukic
 Marko Bagarić
 Vladimir Rivero Hernandez
 Julius Marcinkevicius
 Arunas Vaskevicius
 Oleg Grebnev
 Milos Padezanin
 Marko Vujin
 Marian Kleis
 Michal Kopčo
 Peter Kukučka
 Matus Mino
 Richard Štochl

In European competition
R3: Round 3 / R4: Round 4
GM: Group Matches / 1/8: Last 16 / 1/4: Quarter Final / 1/2: Semi Final / F: Final

EHF Champions League

EHF Cup Winners' Cup (defunct)

EHF Cup

References

External links
 Official website of Dunaferr SE
 Team profile on the European Handball Federation official website

Hungarian handball clubs
Handball clubs established in 1951
1951 establishments in Hungary
Dunaújváros